Woodhall or Wood Hall may refer to:

Places in the United Kingdom
Woodhall, an area of Welwyn Garden City, Hertfordshire, England
Woodhall, Lincolnshire, England, a small village
site of the former Woodhall Junction railway station
Woodhall, North Yorkshire, England, a hamlet in Askrigg parish
Woodhall, North Yorkshire, a hamlet in Hemingbrough parish
Woodhall, Port Glasgow, an area of Port Glasgow, Inverclyde
Woodhall railway station
Woodhall Farm, an area of Hemel Hempstead, Hertfordshire
Wood Hall Hotel and Spa, a country house hotel near Linton, West Yorkshire
Woodhall House, Edinburgh, Scotland, a mansion
Woodhall Park, a country house near Watton-at-Stone, Hertfordshire
Woodhall Spa, Lincolnshire, England, a former spa town and civil parish 
Woodhall Spa Cottage Museum, a community museum
Woodhall Spa Golf Club, a private golf club

Places elsewhere
Wood Hall, a community in Clarendon, Jamaica
Wood Hall (Callaghan, Virginia), an historic home in Virginia, U.S.

People
Dale Woodhall (born 1961), Australian rules footballer
George Woodhall (1863–1924), English footballer
Norrie Woodhall (1907–2011), English stage actress
Richie Woodhall (born 1968), English boxer

See also
Woodall (disambiguation)
Woodell (disambiguation)
Woodhull (disambiguation)